Elizabeth Newkirk Seimes served as the 27th President General of the Daughters of the American Revolution.

Personal life
Betty was born in Wilmington, Delaware, on 8 July 1901 and died 24 March 1990 in Easton, Maryland. She attended Alexis I. duPont High School and Goldey Wilmington Commercial College (now Goldey–Beacom College). Betty married Erwin F Seimes, who died in 1970, and both are buried in Gracelawn Memorial Park in New Castle, DE. Betty worked as a secretary and office manager for Allied Kid Company of Wilmington and as the executive secretary for Governor Richard C. McMullen, from 1937 to 1941.

DAR Membership
Seimes was elected DAR President General in 1968, having joined the DAR the Cooch's Bridge Chapter of Delaware in 1938. She helped organize the Colonel David Hall Chapter in Lewes, DE, 1951. She served as State Regent of Delaware, Recording Secretary General, and First Vice President General. She received the Sons of the American Revolution Gold Good Citizenship Medal in 1977 from the Delaware State Society.

President General Administration
Seimes was elected President General in 1968 and installed during the 77th Continental Congress, having defeated Dorothy W. S. Ragan. Her slate of executive officers were:
 First Vice President General: Mrs. Henry Stewart Jones
 Chaplain General: Mrs. Ralph Allen Killey
 Recording Secretary General: Mrs. Lyle Johnston Howland
 Corresponding Secretary General: Mrs. George Jacob Walz
 Organizing Secretary General: Mrs. Wilson King Barnes
 Treasurer General: Mrs. Nile Eugene Faust
 Registrar General: Mrs. Richard Denny Shelby
 Historian General: Mrs. Donald Spicer
 Librarian General: Mrs. George Sprague Tolman III
 Curator General: Mrs. Carl William Kietzman
 Reporter General: Mrs. Lawrence Russell Andrus

She had three themes, one for each year of her administration: 1st year: “One Country, One Constitution, One Destiny;” 2nd year: “God grants liberty only to those who love it, and are always ready to guard and defend it;” 3rd year: “Where Law Ends, Tyranny Begins,” by William Pitt. Her symbol was a four-leaf clover and her unofficial project was “tying up loose ends.”

Seimes' administration coincided with the Vietnam War, which impacted their work. As part of the DAR's mission of Patriotism, they authorized Certificates of Honor to be presented to the families of servicemen killed in the war.  As President General Sullivan before her had done, Seimes spoke out against the burning of draft cards.  She called it "near treason," and advocated for strong punishment.

Highlights from the Seimes administration include:
 Installation of computers for administrative use and membership records
 Establishment of the Seimes Microfilm Center (later Seimes Technology Center)
 Construction of the  Seimes-Thomas Classroom Building at Kate Duncan Smith DAR School
 Focus on reduction of debt and cost-cutting measures
 Completion of the indexing and cataloguing of the Americana Collection
 The 80th Continental Congress was aired on NBC, with President Richard Nixon giving an address
 Seimes represented the DAR on The Dick Cavett Show on 14 July 1970

Other Associations
 The National Gavel Society (President, 1972–1975)
 Rehoboth Art League
 Colonial Dames
 National Society of Daughters of Founders and Patriots of America

References

Daughters of the American Revolution people